Lessler is a surname. Notable people with the surname include:

Judith T. Lessler (born 1943), American statistician and organic farmer
Montague Lessler (1869–1938), American politician
Nancy Lessler, American dancer, actor, and mural painter

See also
Lesser